Statistics of Primera Divisió in the 1999/2000 season.

Overview
It was contested by 8 teams, and Constel·lació Esportiva won the championship.

League table

Results

References
Andorra - List of final tables (RSSSF)

Primera Divisió seasons
Andorra
1999–2000 in Andorran football